Thelymitra × macmillanii, commonly called the red sun orchid or crimson sun orchid is a species of orchid that is endemic to south-eastern Australia. It has a single tapering, channelled leaf and up to five bright red, sometimes yellow flowers. It is a natural hybrid between T. antennifera and T. carnea or T. rubra.

Description
There are one or two bracts along the flowering stem. The lobe on the top of the anther is very small and warty. Flowering occurs from August to September.

Taxonomy and naming
Thelymitra × macmillanii was first formally described in 1865 by Ferdinand von Mueller from a specimen collected near Mount Eliza and Mount Martha, and the description was published in Fragmenta phytographiae Australiae. The specific epithet (x macmillanii) honours "T.McMillan" who collected the type specimen.

Distribution and habitat
The red sun orchid grows in grassland, woodland and forest where its parent species grow together. It is found in central and western Victoria and in the south-east of South Australia.

References

External links

macmillanii
Endemic orchids of Australia
Orchids of Victoria (Australia)
Orchids of South Australia
Plants described in 1865
Interspecific orchid hybrids